Baqa-Jatt was an Israeli Arab city in the Haifa District of Israel established in 2003 through a merger of Baqa al-Gharbiyye and Jatt. However, the merger was dissolved on 1 November 2010. Encompassing an area of 18,100 dunams (18.1 km²), Baqa-Jatt was part of the region known as the Triangle.

Demographics
According to CBS, in 2005 the ethnic makeup of the city was entirely Arab, with no Jews. A total of 48.8% residents were 19 years of age or younger, 16.1% between 20 and 29, 19.3% between 30 and 44, 10.4% from 45 to 59, 2.1% from 60 to 64, and 3.3% 65 years of age or older. The population growth rate in 2005 was 2.36%. The population in 2007 was 32,400—an increase of approximately 700 since the previous year.

Education
According to CBS, there were 10 schools and 5,391 students in Baqa-Jatt in 2005: six elementary schools with an enrollment of 3,194 students, and four post-elementary schools (Baqa-Jatt does not divide between middle and secondary) with 2,197 students. 57.8% of 12th grade students were entitled to a matriculation certificate in 2005.

Income
According to CBS, there were 7,175 salaried workers and 1,216 self-employed in Baqa-Jatt. The mean monthly wage in 2004 for a salaried worker in the city was 4,340 NIS, a positive change of 14.7% compared to 2004. Salaried males had a mean monthly wage of NIS 4,874 (a change of 8.3%) versus NIS 3,154 for females (a change of 48%). The mean income for the self-employed was 4,516. There were 174 people who received unemployment benefits and 2,474 people who received an income guarantee.

Sports
Since December 2005, an interfaith basketball program, PeacePlayers International, has been operating in Israel. Samer Jassar, a resident of Jatt, was spotted as an upcoming talent by an NBA general manager, and is now at one of the top basketball prep schools in the United States.

See also
Arab localities in Israel

References

Former cities in Israel
Arab localities in Israel
Triangle (Israel)
2003 establishments in Israel
2010 disestablishments in Israel
Populated places established in 2003
Populated places disestablished in 2010